Perizoma oxygramma is a species of geometrid moth in the family Geometridae. It is found in North America.

The MONA or Hodges number for Perizoma oxygramma is 7323.

References

Further reading

 
 

Perizoma
Articles created by Qbugbot
Moths described in 1896